FEMS Microbiology Ecology is one of the seven FEMS, peer-reviewed scientific journals, which covers all aspects of microbial ecology.

According to the Journal Citation Reports, the journal has a 2021 impact factor of 4.519.

The editor-in-chief is Max Häggblom.

References

External links 
 

Microbial population biology
Microbiology journals
Ecology journals
English-language journals
Publications established in 1985
Oxford University Press academic journals
Federation of European Microbiological Societies academic journals